Câlnic (Hungarian/Turkish: Kelnek) is a commune in Alba County, Transylvania, Romania, composed of two villages, Câlnic and Deal (Dál). Câlnic village is known for its castle, which is on UNESCO's list of World Heritage Sites.

The castle

Câlnic Citadel, first mentioned in 1269, is very well preserved. Built as a noble's residence, it was bought in 1430 by local peasants and fortified. It consists of a large court surrounded by walls and some buildings adjacent to the walls. In the middle of the court there is a large donjon as well as a chapel. The castle differs from most other constructions of this type in that it is not situated on a hilltop but rather in a depression, much lower than the surrounding hills. This position, clearly inconvenient in case of a siege, can be explained by the castle's first function as a residence, not meant as a defensive construction.

See also
List of castles in Romania
Tourism in Romania
Villages with fortified churches in Transylvania

Bibliography
Liviu Stoica, Gheorghe Stoica, Gabriela Popa - Castles & fortresses in Transylvania: Alba County / Castele și cetăți din Transilvania: Județul Alba, Cluj-Napoca, 2009,

References

Communes in Alba County
Localities in Transylvania
Villages with fortified churches in Transylvania